Pattukottai Periyappa is a 1994 Indian Tamil-language comedy drama film written and directed by Visu. The film stars Lakshmi, Anand Babu, Mohini and Visu. It was released on 23 September 1994.

Plot 
The story portrays the rivalry between a rich arrogant women, Aranthangi Akilandeshwari(Y. Vijaya) and an ambitious lady, Jhansi (Lakshmi) (Jawahar nagar ladies club president). The ensue between them leads to cancellation of Pitchumani(Anand Babu) and Uma's(Mohini) marriage. Pattukotai Periyappa (Visu), who is Pitchumani's uncle, tries to conduct the marriage against those women forms the rest of the story.

Cast 

Lakshmi as Jawahar Nagar 'Jhansi'
Anand Babu as Pitchumani
Mohini as Uma
Visu as Pattukottai Periyappa
Vivek as Manmadan (TTR)
Y. Vijaya as Akilandeshwari
Vinodhini as Alamelu
S. S. Chandran as Narayanaswami, clerk in Pitchumani's office
Delhi Ganesh as Pitchumani's father
Chinni Jayanth as Telex Pandian
Kumarimuthu as fake inspector
Madhan Bob as office Manager
Kavithalaya Krishnan as Balu, Uma's brother
T. V. Varadarajan as Varadan, Akilandeshwari's brother
Manager Cheena as Alamelu's father

Soundtrack 
Soundtrack was composed by Deva and lyrics were written by Kalidasan.

References

External links 
 

1990s Tamil-language films
1994 comedy-drama films
1994 films
Films directed by Visu
Films scored by Deva (composer)
Films with screenplays by Visu
Indian comedy-drama films